Ephoria lybia is a moth in the family Apatelodidae. It was described by Herbert Druce in 1898.

References

Apatelodidae
Moths described in 1898